The Palace of the National Military Circle, also known as the Officers' Circle Palace (Romanian:Cercul Militar Național) is located on Constantin Mile street in Bucharest, Romania. It was built in 1911, based on plans drawn by chief architect Dimitrie Maimarolu, using French neoclassical style. The beneficiary was the Officers' Circle of the Bucharest military garrison, which was founded in 1876.

History of the palace
The palace was built on the site of the old Sărindar monastery; the fountain in front of the palace bears its name. The construction was done by a team headed by architect Maimarolu,  in collaboration with engineers Anghel Saligny and Elie Radu, together with Paul Saligny and Mircea Radu; the interior decoration was supervised by architect .

During the 1916 German occupation of Bucharest in the First World War, the building's interiors were devastated. After the end of the war, the palace was officially inaugurated in 1923. During the communist period, the name was replaced with "Central House of the Army" (Casa Centrală a Armatei). In 1989, it was renamed the "National Military Circle" (Cercul Militar Național).

Today, the National Military Circle palace is considered a historic and architectural monument. It represents the central cultural institution of the Romanian army and it is also used for various cultural events and for representation and protocol purposes. The restaurant and the terrace are open to the public.

History of the Military Circle
The Officers' Circle of the Bucharest military garrison was founded on  December 15, 1876; its first director was General Alexandru Zefcari. For a while, the Officers' Circle was housed in rental locations, near  and Calea Victoriei.

Directors

Gallery

References

External links
 Official website 

Palaces in Bucharest
Historic monuments in Bucharest
Ministry of National Defence (Romania)
Military of Romania
Government buildings completed in 1923
Calea Victoriei